Transformers: Age of Extinction – The Score is a two-part soundtrack album for the 2014 film of the same name. The score was written by Steve Jablonsky, with help from fellow composer Hans Zimmer and additional music by alternative rock band Imagine Dragons. An EP was released on June 30, 2014, which features four suites, and serves as a teaser for the score, which was released on July 3, 2014. Both albums were released through the film's distributor Paramount Pictures.

Background
As with the previous three films of the franchise, Steve Jablonsky handled the film's score, and it is his sixth collaboration with director Michael Bay. Jablonsky and Bay worked on the score from December 2013 to June 2014, one month before the film's release, which exhausted Jablonsky. The two focused on creating themes for the film's new characters, although the two mutually decided to incorporate some of the themes of the first trilogy.

Jablonsky also collaborated with fellow composer Hans Zimmer and alternative rock band Imagine Dragons in the score, as well as the film's theme song, "Battle Cry". Bay wanted to work with Imagine Dragons after being "drawn to the emotion of 'Demons' and 'Radioactive' the first time [he] heard those songs, and [he] knew [he] wanted that same energy and heart for this movie." About his collaboration with the band Jablonsky said, "It immediately hit me more than some of the previous ones [I] had done...it was a much closer collaboration than I've had in the past," compared to his previous collaborations with bands Linkin Park and Goo Goo Dolls. Imagine Dragons had finished touring for two years their debut album, Night Visions (2012), and wanted to work on their next studio album, before Bay called them to work on the film's score. The band felt that working on the film could increase their music's exposure worldwide. Imagine Dragons was brought to Los Angeles for the collaboration; Jablonsky also traveled to the band's studio in Las Vegas, Nevada to record with the band. The band's lead singer Dan Reynolds recorded vocals, while drummer Daniel Platzman played the viola. Composer Joseph Trapanese also provided additional music for the film.

On June 30, 2014, Jablonsky released an extended play featuring four tracks as a teaser for the official score, which features variations of the four themes. On July 3, 2014, three days after the EP's release, the official score was released on iTunes, although Jablonsky stated that physical copies will "[take] a bit longer."

On October 7, 2014, the score was released on CD by record label La-La Land Records. It is a limited edition of 3000 units.

On November 20, 2014 Steve Jablonsky commented via Facebook that the score would no longer be sold on iTunes after it had reached its limit of 15,000 units before re-use fees would have to be paid. Jablonsky personally expressed his own disappointment in the turn of events, hoping there would be a way to eventually re-release the score, along with the score to Transformers: Dark of the Moon, which also had been removed on iTunes several months prior when it also reached the 15,000 unit limit.

Track listing

Transformers: Age of Extinction – The EP

Transformers: Age of Extinction – The Score

Complete score

On 21 December 2014, Paramount released the complete score for the film as part of their "For Your Consideration (FYC)" campaign. This soundtracltrack contains the score as heard in the final film, featuring both unreleased tracks as well as film edits of previously tracks. For unknown reasons, the track "The Legend Exists" from the standard soundtrack is absent. Two of the tracks ("Dogs Chase Tessa/Searching for Tessa" and "Weapons Room") are also listed in the tracklist but feature no audio.

References

External links
 Official Movie Website

Age of Extinction – The Score
2014 albums
2010s film soundtrack albums
Film scores